Semyonovka is a rural locality (a village) in Posyolok Krasnoye Ekho, Gus-Khrustalny District, Vladimir Oblast, Russia. The population was 595 as of 2010. There are 5 streets.

Geography 
Semyonovka is located 26 km northeast of Gus-Khrustalny (the district's administrative centre) by road. Pervomaysky is the nearest rural locality.

References 

Rural localities in Gus-Khrustalny District